Machida may refer to

Machida (surname)
Machida, Tokyo, a city in Japan
Machida High School, high school in Machida
Machida Station (disambiguation), multiple train stations in Japan